Adeh (also Romanized as Ādeh; also known as Ada and Ādeh-ye Bozorg) is a village in Tala Tappeh Rural District, Nazlu District, Urmia County, West Azerbaijan Province, Iran. The name Ada is believed to come from a Turkish word meaning "island," which itself is a Turkification of the village's previous name, Jazarta, meaning "island" in Assyrian Neo-Aramaic. In the 2006 census, its population was noted to be 151, in 41 families. As of 2014, there were only 3 Assyrian families remaining in Ada, down from 700 Assyrian families prior to the Assyrian genocide. 

The village was exclusively inhabited by Assyrians until the Assyrian genocide. There are four Assyrian churches in the village: Mar Daniel (which is said to have been built in the 4th century), Mart Maryam, Mar Youkhanna, and an Assyrian Presbyterian Church. In addition, the village has a "Shotapoota," or Assyrian community center, and is known for its festival of Mar Daniel (shara d'Mar Daniel).

Notable people
 Bob Miner; both parents were Iranian Assyrians from Adeh.

See also
 Assyrians in Iran
 List of Assyrian settlements

References 

Populated places in Urmia County
Assyrian settlements